Gapp is a surname. Notable people with the surname include:

Franz Gapp (born 1919), German Luftwaffe pilot
Jakob Gapp (1897–1943), Austrian Marianist priest
Paul Gapp (1928–1992), American journalist

See also
GAPP (disambiguation)